Jim Ruddy Anicet Bilba (born April 17, 1968 in Pointe-à-Pitre) is a former professional basketball player and coach, from France.

Professional career
Bilba won the EuroLeague championship with Limoges CSP in 1993.

National team career
Bilba won the silver medal at the 2000 Summer Olympics, while playing with the senior French national basketball team.

Coaching career
After he retired from playing professional basketball, Bilba became an assistant coach of the French basketball club, Limoges CSP.

External links
Euroleague.net Profile
FIBA Profile
FIBA Europe Profile
Spanish League Profile 

1968 births
Living people
AEK B.C. players
ASVEL Basket players
Basketball players at the 2000 Summer Olympics
Centers (basketball)
Cholet Basket players
French basketball coaches
French men's basketball players
French expatriate sportspeople in Greece
French expatriate sportspeople in Spain
French people of Guadeloupean descent
Liga ACB players
Limoges CSP players
Medalists at the 2000 Summer Olympics
Olympic basketball players of France
Olympic medalists in basketball
Olympic silver medalists for France
Power forwards (basketball)
Saski Baskonia players